Modereko is the debut album from jazz band Modereko, a side project of drummer John Molo (of Bruce Hornsby and the Range), released in 2001.

Track listing 

 Sahara Sod  3:59
 Some of That! 2:15
 Glitterati 3:14
 Tree Blind 4:38
 Nitrous 3:25
 L.A. - Va 2:45
 Slump Town  3:22
 Old Creed
 Schoolin   4:18
 Heart of Seoul  4:09
 Bonus Track

Album credits 

 Kevin Davis - Percussion
 Jimmy Haslip - Bass
 T.J. Johnson - Mandolin
 Tim Kobza - Organ, Bass
 Modereko - Producer
 John Molo - Percussion
 Dave Palmer - Keyboards
 Zac Rae - Organ, Bass, Wurlitzer
 Bobby Read - Tenor Saxophone, Woodwinds
 Bruce Richardson - Remixing

References 

2001 albums
Blue Thumb Records albums